Mausumi Dikpati is a scientist at the High Altitude Observatory operated by the National Center for Atmospheric Research.

Career 
In March 2006, she predicted the strength and timing of the next solar cycle based on simulations of the astrophysics of the solar interior. During 2006-2007 Mausumi Dikpati issued three predictions for solar cycle 24 -- (i) a delayed onset of solar cycle 24 which would start in late 2008 instead of 2006, (ii) a strong solar cycle 24 whose peak would be 30%-50% stronger than the previous cycle ('Cycle 23'), and (iii) the solar cycle in southern hemisphere would be stronger than that in the northern hemisphere of the Sun. Two of these three predictions, (i) and (iii) came true. Her research paper explaining the cause of delayed onset of solar cycle 24 was one of the top 100 discoveries in the Discover Magazine. Currently she is improving her solar dynamo model by building a more accurate dynamo-based solar cycle prediction tool which can assimilate solar magnetic fields and flow data in ways used in oceanic and atmospheric predictions.

References

External links
Dikpati's home page at NCAR

Living people
Women scientists from West Bengal
Year of birth missing (living people)